The Revolution is the debut studio album by Canadian rapper, Belly which was released on June 5, 2007 in Canada on Capital Prophets Records Inc. The album became a commercial success a month after its release, when it was certified gold by the CRIA for shipping over 50,000 copies. The lead single "Pressure" won Best MuchVibe video at the 2007 MuchMusic Video Awards and also peaked at #10 on the Canadian Singles Chart. Also the album won the Rap Recording of the Year at the 2008 Juno Awards. All videos for the singles received heavy rotation on Much Music. In April 2008 for the 2008 MuchMusic Video Awards, "Ridin'" was nominated for 4 MMVAs and won 1 of them for best rap video. "I'm the Man" was also nominated for 1 MMVA making Belly the only artist that year to be nominated in 5 categories.

Track listing

The People (disc one)

The System (disc two)

Charts

References

2007 debut albums
Belly (rapper) albums
CP Music Group albums
Juno Award for Rap Recording of the Year recordings